Dioscorea oppositifolia  is a type of yam (Dioscorea) native to Myanmar (Burma) and to the Indian Subcontinent (India, Sri Lanka, Bangladesh).

Taxonomy
The plant previously called D. opposita is now considered to be the same species as D. oppositifolia. However Dioscorea polystachya is often incorrectly called Dioscorea opposita as well. Botanical works that point out that error may list, e.g., Dioscorea opposita auct. non Thunb. as a synonym of D. polystachya.

See also
 Dioscorea polystachya
 Yam (vegetable)
 Dioscorea villosa

References

External links
 Dioscorea batatas - Decne. (Plants For A Future)
 Dioscorea opposita (Australian New Crops)
 Dioscorea batatas (Australian New Crops)

Yams (vegetable)
oppositifolia
Tropical agriculture
Plants used in traditional Chinese medicine
Flora of Myanmar
Flora of the Indian subcontinent
Plants described in 1753
Taxa named by Carl Linnaeus